Lanxi County is a county of western Heilongjiang province, People's Republic of China. It is under the jurisdiction of the prefecture-level city of Suihua.

Administrative divisions 
Huma County is divided into 4 subdistricts, 8 towns and 7 townships. 
4 subdistricts
 Yanhe, Shunda, Lanya, Zhengyang
8 towns
 Lanxi, Yulin, Linjiang, Pingshan, Hongguang, Yuanda, Kangrong, Liaoyuan
7 townships
 Bei'an, Changjiang, Lanhe, Hongxing, Zhanggang, Xinghuo, Fendou

Demographics 

Climate

Notes and references 

 
Lanxi
Suihua